The men's 200 metre butterfly event at the 2004 Olympic Games was contested at the Olympic Aquatic Centre of the Athens Olympic Sports Complex in Athens, Greece on August 16 and 17.

After finishing fifth in Sydney four years earlier, U.S. swimmer Michael Phelps added a second gold to his collection. He touched the wall first in 1:54.04, just 0.11 of a second under his own world record. Japan's Takashi Yamamoto earned a silver medal in an Asian record of 1:54.56. Stephen Parry ended Great Britain's 8-year medal drought with a bronze in 1:55.52. Parry also put his teammate Melanie Marshall on the spot to fulfill her promise of shaving her head if the Brits won a single swimming medal in Athens.

Meanwhile, Poland's Paweł Korzeniowski pulled off a fourth-place effort in a national record of 1:56.00. Defending Olympic champion Tom Malchow rounded out the final to eighth place in 1:57.48, matching his semifinal time in the process.

Other notable swimmers missed the top 8 final, featuring Denys Sylantyev (Ukraine), Justin Norris (Australia), Franck Esposito (France), and Anatoly Polyakov (Russia).

Records
Prior to this competition, the existing world and Olympic records were as follows.

The following new world and Olympic records were set during this competition.

Results

Heats

Semifinals

Semifinal 1

Semifinal 2

Final

References

External links
Official Olympic Report

M
Men's events at the 2004 Summer Olympics